The Roman Catholic Diocese of Ica is a diocese located in the city of Ica in the Ecclesiastical province of Lima in Peru.

History
10 August 1946: Established as Diocese of Ica from the Metropolitan Archdiocese of Lima

Bishops

Ordinaries
Francisco Rubén Berroa y Bernedo (1946.11.24 – 1958.07.12)
Alberto Maria Dettmann y Aragón, O.P. (1959.02.06 – 1973.10.05)
Guido Breña López, O.P. (1973.10.05 – 2007.10.31)
Héctor Eduardo Vera Colona (since 2007.10.31)

Auxiliary bishop
Jesús Mateo Calderón Barrueto, O.P. (1969-1972), appointed Bishop of Puno

See also
Roman Catholicism in Peru

Sources
 GCatholic.org
 Catholic Hierarchy

Roman Catholic dioceses in Peru
Roman Catholic Ecclesiastical Province of Lima
Christian organizations established in 1946
Roman Catholic dioceses and prelatures established in the 20th century